is a retired Japanese long jumper. She placed 12th at the 1960 Summer Olympics and won a silver medal at the 1962 Asian Games.

References

1940 births
Living people
Japanese female long jumpers
Olympic female long jumpers
Olympic athletes of Japan
Athletes (track and field) at the 1960 Summer Olympics
Asian Games silver medalists for Japan
Asian Games medalists in athletics (track and field)
Athletes (track and field) at the 1962 Asian Games
Medalists at the 1962 Asian Games
Japan Championships in Athletics winners
20th-century Japanese women